Gabriele "Gabi" Reinsch (born 23 September 1963 in Cottbus) is a German track and field athlete. She represented East Germany in the 1988 Olympic Games in discus throw.

This was  further than the previous record, set by the Czechoslovakian Zdenka Šilhavá.

Reinsch began competing at the age of 14 and tried at first the high jump and shot put, even placing second in the shot put at the 1981 junior European championships. In 1982 she switched to the discus.

International competitions

1988 Olympic Games:  (67.26 - 66.50 - 63.30 - 65.88 - 66.40 - Foul)
1990 European Championships: (Foul - 63.46 - 64.30 - Foul - 66.08 - 65.06)

Reinsch belonged to the Cottbus sport club until 1985 and then from 1986 to the ASK Potsdam. She trained with Lothar Hillebrand.  During her competitive years she was 1.84 meters tall and weighed 88 kilograms.

External links
 
 
 
 Universiade (gbrathletics.com)
 European Championships (gbrathletics.com)

1963 births
Living people
Sportspeople from Cottbus
People from Bezirk Cottbus
East German female discus throwers
German female discus throwers
Olympic athletes of East Germany
Athletes (track and field) at the 1988 Summer Olympics
World Athletics record holders
Universiade medalists in athletics (track and field)
Universiade silver medalists for East Germany
Medalists at the 1987 Summer Universiade
Medalists at the 1989 Summer Universiade